Tragelaphus is a genus of medium-to-large-sized spiral-horned antelopes. It contains several species of bovines, all of which are relatively antelope-like. Species in this genus tend to be large in size and lightly built, and have long necks and considerable sexual dimorphism. Elands, including the common eland (Taurotragus oryx), are embedded within this genus, meaning that Taurotragus must be subsumed into Tragelaphus to avoid paraphyly. Alternatively, Taurotragus could be maintained as a separate genus, if the nyala and the lesser kudu are relocated to their own monospecific genera, respectively Nyala and Ammelaphus.  Other generic synonyms include Strepsiceros (which applies to T. strepsiceros) and Boocercus (for T. eurycerus). The name "Tragelaphus" comes from the mythical tragelaph.

Taxonomy and phylogeny

Tragelaphus  is a genus in the tribe Tragelaphini and the family Bovidae. The genus authority is French zoologist Henri Marie Ducrotay de Blainville, who first mentioned it in the journal Bulletin des Sciences, par la Société Philomatique in 1816. The name is not of modern scientific invention, but comes from ancient Greek τραγέλαφος (tragélaphos), from τράγος (trágos), meaning a "male goat", and ἔλαφος (élaphos), meaning a "deer".

Extant species
It is generally treated as having eight species, namely:.

An alternative classification, supported by genetic data, would recognise 11 species in five groups, which could be treated as subgenera or full genera: (i) Nyala for T. angasii; (ii) Ammelaphus for T. imberbis; (iii) Taurotragus for the two elands (T. oryx and T. derbianus); (iv) Strepsiceros for T. strepsiceros and (v) Tragelaphus restricted to T. buxtoni, T. spekei, T. scriptus, T. sylvaticus (Imbabala - separated from a polyphyletic T. scriptus) and T. eurycerus. In terms of divergence time estimates, a 2006 study showed that core Tragelaphus (now known to excude T. angasii and T. imberbis) diverged from Taurotragus (elands) towards the end of the Late Miocene.

References 

 
Bovines
Mammal genera
Taxa named by Henri Marie Ducrotay de Blainville